Indira Kadambi (born 30 September 1969, Kundapur, Karnataka) is a senior Indian performer and teacher of Bharatanatyam dance.

Early life 
Starting her initial training at the age of six, Indira learned under her Guru, Sri Janardhan Sharma. With her learnings continued with training from Usha Datar, she entered the industry as a debut performer. Pursuing dance as a career, she also was a disciple of Narmadha and Savitri Jagannath Rao. In her advancement as a dancer, she has collaborated with her Guru Padma Bhushan Kalanidhi Narayanan. She learnt the essence of Abhinaya (expressions in rasa). 

She indulged in Mohiniattam while training under Kalyanikutty Amma. In addition to that, she also learnt Carnatic Vocal music from Belakwadi Srinivasa Iyengar and Nattuvangam from Kamala Rani. Along with her love for dance and music, she is an avid nature explorer and has had basic and advanced mountaineering training. She also took yoga and fitness-related courses from Dr. Kannan Pugazhendi.

Performances 
Indira has performed in several renowned dance recitals with stars like Amjad Ali Khan, Birju Maharaj, Hariprasad Chaurasia, Jasraj, Kelucaran Mohapatra, Vishwamohan Bhat, Zakir Hussain. She has been to several countries like the UK, USA, Germany, France, Holland and Malaysia for dance recitals, lectures and workshops. She has been widely recognized for her accomplishments through radio interviews, reviews in papers and television programs. Indira is a chosen artist of the Indian Council for Cultural Relations (ICCR), Government of India.

Institution

Several dedicated  students and teachers  from India and abroad visit Indira annually for training sessions. She specializes in teaching Abhinaya, and Nattuvāngam. She is a well known Abhinaya teacher.

In the year 2011, eAmbalam, an institution started by her and her husband T.V.Ramprasadh in 1989, launched the World's first Online college of Indian Performing Arts integrated with Yoga. eAmbalam also  launched Chennai's very first outdoor festival "SaMaaGaMa" in December 2011. In 2014, they launched Life Art Education, a K12 program in schools where Yoga, Music, Dance and Personality developments are part of school curriculum.

Works  
As a performer, Kadambi travelled the world with her wealth of knowledge on Bharatanatyam and Mohiniattam, infusing it in her various performances. Each performance has a unique influence on the contemporary. Some popular performances are: 

Choreography

 Koham - The Search!
 Varsha Rithu (The Monsoon)
 Vamshi, The Divine Flute
 Hasya (Laugh or Humour)
 Purusha Parinaam (Man through time)
 Sadashivam Darisanam (Shiva as a contemporary)
 Ashta Nyakirarin Ishta Murugan (depiction of the Ashta Nayikas)
 Manomaaneeyam (connection of souls)
 Juganbandhi - (The duet)
 Kavya-Chitra-Geeta-Nritya' – A programme of spontaneous creations in Sanskrit verse, Painting, Music and Dance with Shatavadhani R. Ganesh, and B.K.S. Varma

Achievements 
Kadambi has organised workshops all over the globe to culturally immersive her art and share her learnings as both basic seminars and masterclasses. From classes on the technical aspects of Bharatanatyam to the art of expression and nattuvangam and masterclasses in Hasta Viniyoga for a global perspective in dance as a study.

Lecture Demonstrations 

 Vaachika Abhinaya in Bharathi Vritti - (based on Natyasastra, Bangalore - 1996)
 Dance-in-Depth series - (Abhinaya in Bharatanatyam, Los Angeles -1998)
 Ashtanayika (eight kinds of heroines described in Natya Shastra, Philadelphia-2003)
 Extensions to Tradition - ( Exploring new concepts, looking into existing traditional repertoire in a creative way, Chennai - 2005)
 Hasya Rasa (Humor, The School, KFI -2003)

Awards 

 Nrithya kala sagara - Cleveland Thyagaraja Aradhana
 Vidya Tapaswi - Tapas foundation, Chennai
 Senior Dancer Award - Natyarangam, Narada Gana Sabha, Chennai (2002)
 Natya Shanthala - Aryabhatta Cultural Association, Bangalore (1996)
 Best Dancer Award - South Central Zone Cultural Centre, Government of India (1993)

References
 http://www.narthaki.com/info/reviews/review59.html
 https://www.bbc.com/news/business-22516037
 http://www.thehindujobs.com/thehindu/mp/2003/05/06/stories/2003050600010100.htm
http://indirakadambi.com/home.html
http://www.eambalam.org/kalpavriksha/faculty.php?level=4&level1_id=1&level2_id=9&level3_id=3&pageid=10

Bharatanatyam exponents
People from Udupi district
Indian female classical dancers
Performers of Indian classical dance
1969 births
Living people
Dancers from Karnataka
20th-century Indian dancers
Women artists from Karnataka
20th-century Indian women artists